The Bancroft Hotel is a historic hotel building at 50 Franklin Street in Worcester, Massachusetts.  Built in 1912 and expanded in 1925, it is one of the city's finest examples of Beaux Arts architecture, and was for many years its finest and most opulent hotel. It was listed on the National Register of Historic Places in 1980.  It has since been converted into luxury residences, and is called Bancroft on the Grid.

Description
The former Bancroft Hotel is located in downtown Worcester, on the south side of Franklin Street, facing the Worcester Common and City Hall to the north.  It is a ten-story structure, with a steel frame faced in brick, terracotta, and stone.  The ground floor presents an arcade of arches to both Franklin and Portland Streets, finished in marble.  The second floor is a band of sash windows with elaborate terra cotta surrounds.  The next five floors are uniform, with sash windows in rectangular openings.  The bays at the corners are finished in light-colored stone, a contrast to the darker brick of the other bays.  The eighth floor once again has more elaborate window treatments, and a detailed cornice separates it from the ninth, which is also crowned by a projecting cornice.

History

The Bancroft Hotel was built by Niagara Falls businessman Frank A. Dudley and operated by the United Hotels Company.  It was designed by Buffalo, New York architects Esenwein & Johnson in the Beaux Arts style and was completed in 1912 at a cost of over $1.2 million.  The hotel was named for Worcester historian and politician George Bancroft.

The Bancroft hosted a women's tea in April of John F. Kennedy's 1952 senatorial campaign against Henry Cabot Lodge Jr. (who was also there that day).  It was added to the National Register of Historic Places in 1980 and is currently tied as the 11th tallest building in Worcester.  The building was operated as a hotel until 1964.

See also
National Register of Historic Places listings in northwestern Worcester, Massachusetts
National Register of Historic Places listings in Worcester County, Massachusetts

References

External links
The Grid - Buildings

Hotel buildings on the National Register of Historic Places in Massachusetts
Beaux-Arts architecture in Massachusetts
Hotel buildings completed in 1912
Buildings and structures in Worcester, Massachusetts
Hotels established in 1912
National Register of Historic Places in Worcester, Massachusetts
1912 establishments in Massachusetts
United Hotels Company of America
Brick buildings and structures